Michael Vlamis (born March 27, 1990) is an American actor, screenwriter, director, and producer known for his role as Michael Guerin in Roswell, New Mexico. Vlamis made his feature directorial debut with his psychological thriller, Crossword.

Early life and education 
Vlamis was born on March 27, 1990, in Chicago, Illinois. He is of Greek, Serbian and Lebanese ancestry. Vlamis moved to California to attend Chapman University, where he starred as a third baseman on the varsity baseball team. Off the diamond, "V-Man" earned a Bachelor of Science degree in entrepreneurship.

Career 
Vlamis began his career in marketing for Modify Watches. He made his television debut in an episode of New Girl and began acting in short films. He appeared in MemE! True Hollywood Story, a short film he wrote that won the 2017 Snapchat Shorts contest, a competition for short films under 120 seconds in length. After quitting the marketing world in 2017 to drive for Uber and focus on writing, Vlamis booked the lead role of Michael Guerin in the CW's Roswell, New Mexico. In 2019, Vlamis co-wrote a biopic about the life of late rapper Mac Miller, titled Blue Side Park. The screenplay was later added to the 2019 Black List, a survey of "most-liked" unproduced film scripts.  Vlamis appeared alongside Chloe Bennet in the 2020 film, 5 Years Apart, which was his first produced feature film. In 2022, he made his feature directorial debut with Crossword, a psychological thriller he also wrote, produced, and acted in. Kenan Thompson's company, Artists For Artists, acquired the film to handle sales.

Personal life 
Vlamis resides in West Hollywood, California.

Filmography

Film

Television

References 

1990 births
Chapman University alumni
American people of Greek descent
Male actors from Chicago
Living people